Artakovo-Vandarets is a rural locality in Belyayevsky Selsoviet Rural Settlement, Konyshyovsky District, Kursk Oblast, Russia. Population:

Geography 
The village is located on the Vandarets River (a left tributary of the Svapa River), 54.5 km from the Russia–Ukraine border, 70 km north-west of Kursk, 8.5 km north-west of the district center – the urban-type settlement Konyshyovka, 7 km from the selsoviet center – Belyayevo.

 Climate
Artakovo-Vandarets has a warm-summer humid continental climate (Dfb in the Köppen climate classification).

Transport 
Artakovo-Vandarets is located 48 km from the federal route  Ukraine Highway, 48 km from the route  Crimea Highway, 30 km from the route  (Trosna – M3 highway), 18 km from the road of regional importance  (Fatezh – Dmitriyev), 8 km from the road  (Konyshyovka – Zhigayevo – 38K-038), 17 km from the road  (Dmitriyev – Beryoza – Menshikovo – Khomutovka), 3.5 km from the road of intermunicipal significance  (Mashkino – railway station near Sokovninka – Naumovka), 5.5 km from the road  (Konyshyovka – Makaro-Petrovskoye, with the access road to the villages of Belyayevo and Chernicheno), on the road  (38N-144 – Artakovo-Vandarets), 6.5 km from the nearest railway station Sokovninka (railway line Navlya – Lgov-Kiyevsky).

The rural locality is situated 76 km from Kursk Vostochny Airport, 168 km from Belgorod International Airport and 277 km from Voronezh Peter the Great Airport.

References

Notes

Sources

Rural localities in Konyshyovsky District